The East Africa Premier League (EAPL) is a Twenty20 cricket competition covering Kenya and Uganda. The EAPL was founded in 2011, together with the East Africa Cup, in the wake of Kenya's disastrous performance in the 2011 Cricket World Cup. It comprises 4 Kenyan provincial franchises as well as 2 teams from Uganda that play each other in a league, culminating in a final between the team that finishes top of the log and the winner of a series of playoff matches. Its main objective is to improve the standard of cricket played in Kenya, and spark a revival on the international stage once again.

References

Twenty20 cricket
Cricket in Kenya
Cricket in Uganda